Trichopezinae are a subfamily of empidoid flies. They are mainly predatory flies like most of their relatives, and generally small to medium-sized, long-legged and large-eyed.

Previously, they were included in the Clinocerinae or the Hemerodromiinae. In some more recent treatments, the Brachystomatinae are considered a distinct family, and the Trichopezinae are placed therein. However, it is more likely that the Brachystomatinae are part of the Empididae, and that the Trichopezinae represent a separate lineage in the same family. The monophyly of the Trichopezinae versus its closest relatives is not firmly established; it seems likely that some changes will be necessary to make this subfamily a natural group.

Selected genera
Apalocnemis Philippi, 1865
Boreodromia Coquillett, 1903
Ceratempis Melander, 1927
Ephydrempis Saigusa, 1986
Gloma Meigen, 1822
Heleodromia Haliday, 1833
Heterophlebus Philippi, 1865
Niphogenia Melander, 1928
Pseudheleodromia Wagner, 2001
Rubistella Garrett-Jones, 1940
Sabroskyella Wilder, 1982
Sematopoda Collin, 1928
Trichopeza Rondani, 1856

References

Empididae
Asilomorpha subfamilies